"Are You Blue or Are You Blind?" is a song by The Bluetones, released as a standalone single, and included on the band's 2006 compilation A Rough Outline: The Singles & B-Sides 95 - 03. On release in 1995 it spent two weeks on the UK charts, peaking at #31.

References

 http://www.discogs.com/Bluetones-Are-You-Blue-Or-Are-You-Blind/release/1645842
 http://www.allmusic.com/album/are-you-blue-or-are-you-blind-mw0001187786

The Bluetones songs
1995 singles
1995 songs
A&M Records singles
Songs written by Eds Chesters
Songs written by Adam Devlin
Songs written by Mark Morriss
Songs written by Scott Morriss